Karachi South District is an administrative district of Karachi Division in Sindh, Pakistan.

History 
Karachi South District is the economic backbone of the country. It has Head Offices of many Corporations, Companies and Banks. Chief Secretary House, Governor House, Chief Minister House, Commissioner House, Commissioner Office, Sindh Assembly, High Court, Embassies and Consulates of different countries and other government offices are also located there.

The district was abolished in 2000, and was divided into two towns namely: Jamshed Town, and Saddar Town.

On 11 July 2011, the Sindh Government restored again Karachi South District.

In November 2013, Jamshed Town was added into Karachi East District, after three eastern towns of that district split up to form a new district named Korangi. Now Karachi South comprise Saddar along with Clifton and Defence area. Karachi South is considered to be the most affluent area of the city.
mujeeb baloch pm of karachi

Demographics
At the time of the 2017 census, Karachi South district had a population of 1,769,230, of which 930,691 were males and 838,349 females. The entire population was urban. The literacy rate is 77.79%: 79.98% for males and 75.33% for females.

The majority religion is Islam, with 94.13% of the population. Hinduism (including Scheduled Castes) is practiced by 4.01% and Christianity by 1.70% of the population.

At the time of the 2017 census, 25.62% of the population spoke Urdu, 15.79% Sindhi, 11.07% Punjabi, 10.67% Balochi, 9.95% Pashto, 5.08% Hindko and 3.73% Saraiki as their first language. A large percentage of the population speaks languages recorded as 'Other' on the census, such as Gujarati.

Administrative Towns of Karachi South
Following is the list of two administrative towns of Karachi South District.

Saddar Town

See also
 Darya Lal Mandir

References

 
Districts of Sindh
Districts of Karachi